Nelson Ricardo Rosario (born December 24, 1989) is a former American football tight end. He was originally signed by the Jacksonville Jaguars as an undrafted free agent in 2012. He played college football at UCLA.

Professional career

Jacksonville Jaguars
Rosario signed with the Jacksonville Jaguars following the 2012 NFL Draft as a rookie free agent on May 4, 2012.

He was released on May 7, 2012.

Carolina Panthers
Rosario was signed by the Carolina Panthers on May 29, 2012. He was cut on August 31 during final cuts, but was signed to the practice squad on September 1, 2012.

On July 30, 2013, Rosario was waived by the Panthers.

References

External links
UCLA Bruins Bio
Jacksonville Jaguars Bio
Carolina Panthers Bio

Further reading

</ref>

1989 births
Living people
Sportspeople from Oceanside, California
Players of American football from California
University of California, Los Angeles alumni
UCLA Bruins football players
American football wide receivers
American football tight ends
Jacksonville Jaguars players
Carolina Panthers players